Body Type are an Australian rock band formed in Sydney, New South Wales. The group consists of Sophie McComish, Annabel Blackman, Georgia Wilkinson-Derums, and Cecil Coleman.

They have released two extended plays: Body Type (2018) and EP2 (2019). Their debut album, Everything Is Dangerous but Nothing's Surprising, was released in May 2022.

History

2016-2019: Early singles, Body Type, and EP2
Body Type was formed in Sydney, New South Wales as an all-female rock group consisting of Sophie McComish, Annabel Blackman, Georgia Wilkinson-Derums, and Cecil Coleman. The band's first singles were "2 6 4" and "Ludlow", released in November 2016. These were followed by "Silver" in August 2017, and in 2018, "Arrow" and "Palms" were released in April and September, respectively. "Palms" became the lead single for the band's debut extended play, the self-titled Body Type, which was released on 19 October 2018 through Partisan Records. The EP featured a new version of "Ludlow", titled "Ludlow (Do You Believe In Karma?)". A music video for the reimagination was also released on the same day as the EP.

Following their debut EP, Body Type began working on a follow-up. On 4 March 2019, EP2 was announced for release on 3 May 2019. The lead single, along with an accompanying music video, titled "Stingray", was released on the same day. The song received praise, with Dan Condon of Double J calling it their best work yet. "Stingray" was followed by "Free To Air" and its music video on 8 April. A third and final single, "Uma", was released on 2 May, one day before the release of EP2. "Uma" also had an accompanying music video. Like Body Type, EP2 was released through Partisan Records. EP2 was included in Stereogums list of the best EPs of 2019.

2022-present: Everything Is Dangerous but Nothing's Surprising
Body Type announced the release of their debut album, Everything Is Dangerous But Nothing's Surprising, on 10 February 2022, alongside the release of the album's first single: "Sex & Rage". On the same day, they also announced that they had departed Partisan Records and signed with the Melbourne-based independent record label Poison City Records. The album's single, "The Charm", was released on 28 April 2022. The album was released on 20 May 2022 via Poison City Records.

In February 2023, Body Type released "Miss the World",  the first single from the band's second studio album, Expired Candy, scheduled for released in 2023.

Discography

Albums

EPs

Awards and nominations

Australian Music Prize
The Australian Music Prize (the AMP) is an annual award of $30,000 given to an Australian band or solo artist in recognition of the merit of an album released during the year of award. It exists to discover, reward and promote new Australian music of excellence.

!  
|-
| 2022
| Everything Is Dangerous but Nothing's Surprising
| Australian Music Prize
| 
| 
|-

References

Australian garage rock groups
Australian post-punk groups
2016 establishments in Australia
Musical groups from Sydney
Musical groups established in 2016